The Scary Dairy is a former dairy farm adjacent to the former Camarillo State Mental Hospital, now California State University, Channel Islands. It was run and maintained by the staff and patients of the hospital as a form of work experience and additional income for the hospital. In the 1960s the dairy was closed and the cows were moved. Since then, the buildings fell into disarray and have since been heavily vandalized.

The land is now a part of the California State University, Channel Islands. The public is welcome to explore by foot during the day. University police officers patrol the area frequently and are on the lookout for large groups of youth, vandals and firearms of any kind (including paintball guns) and any other suspicious activity. The field adjacent to the dairy has been used for sheriff exercises and training. The trails around the dairy are used by hikers, runners and photographers.

References

External links
Scary Dairy at StrangeUSA.com

Haunted attractions (simulated)
Landmarks in Ventura County, California